Lift is the seventh and final studio album by English alternative rock band Love and Rockets, released in 1998 on Red Ant Records.

Background 

Lift overlooked the harder rock of Sweet F.A. in favor of Hot Trip to Heaven's electronic sound. The album produced three singles: the club-oriented "Resurrection Hex", which features samples of Bauhaus' "Stigmata Martyr" and "In the Night"; the pop-oriented "Holy Fool", featuring background vocals by Luscious Jackson's Jill Cunniff; and the promo-only, acronym-laden electronica trip "R.I.P. 20 C."

The sound and title of "Resurrection Hex" instantly fed rumors of a much-anticipated Bauhaus reunion, which was officially announced almost immediately upon release of the record. The simultaneous bankruptcy of the Red Ant Records label — on which Peter Murphy was also an artist — and the subsequent success of the 1998–99 Bauhaus Resurrection tour led to the ultimate demise of Love and Rockets as a project.

Track listing

Personnel 

 Daniel Ash – guitar, saxophone, and vocals
 David J – bass and vocals
 Kevin Haskins – drums and synthesizers

References 

1998 albums
Love and Rockets (band) albums